The Monplaisir Garden is a garden by the Monplaisir Palace of the Peterhof Palace Complex, Russia.

References

Gardens in Saint Petersburg
Cultural heritage monuments of federal significance in Saint Petersburg
Petergof